Águia Vitória is the mascot of Portuguese football club S.L. Benfica. Before every Benfica match at the Estádio da Luz, the eagle flies around the stadium and eventually lands on top of the club's crest without the eagle symbol, completing it.

Vitória is a bald eagle (Haliaeetus leucocephalus), trained by André Rodrigues since April 2011. The original eagle Vitória, whose trainer was Juan Bernabé, flew in the inauguration of the Estádio da Luz on 25 October 2003. It was apprehended days later and released in May 2006. In the meantime, it was replaced by a similar eagle with the same name.

Gloriosa is another eagle that flies in the stadium, where the eagles actually live. They carry red and white ribbons, the club's colours.

See also
 List of individual birds

References

External links

S.L. Benfica
Association football mascots
Individual eagles
Individual animals in Portugal